Jesse Carter was a state legislator, mail contractor, and state militia officer in Tampa, as well as a school co-founder. He was a Democrat.

He was a commanding officer dealing with "Indian disturbances". As a state official, he was involved with provisioning Tampa during the Seminole Wars. He represented the 11th Senatorial District.

His home was where the University of Tampa is now located. He built a schoolhouse for his daughter.

References

Year of birth missing
19th-century American politicians
Democratic Party Florida state senators
Politicians from Tampa, Florida
Year of birth unknown
Year of death unknown
Date of birth unknown
Date of death unknown
Place of birth unknown
Place of death unknown